Ken Gerhard (born October 13, 1967) is an American cryptozoologist and author often featured on various television programs. His works include "The Essential Guide to Bigfoot," "A Menagerie of Mysterious Beasts," "Big Bird: Modern Sightings of Flying Monsters" and "Encounters with Flying Humanoids: Mothman, Manbirds, Gargoyles and Other Winged Beasts." He is also the co-author of "Monsters of Texas" (with Nick Redfern).

Biography
Ken Gerhard is a cryptozoologist and field investigator for the Centre for Fortean Zoology as well as a fellow of the Pangea Institute and consultant for various research groups. He has investigated reports of cryptids and mysterious animals around the world including Bigfoot, the Loch Ness Monster, the Chupacabra, Mothman, Thunderbirds and Werewolves.

In addition to co-hosting the History Channel series Missing in Alaska, he has appeared in three episodes of the television series MonsterQuest (History Channel) and was featured in the History Channel special "The Real Wolfman". Gerhard's other appearances include Ancient Aliens (History Channel), Legend Hunters (Travel Channel), The Unexplained Files (Science Channel), Paranatural (National Geographic), True Monsters (History Channel), Weird or What? with William Shatner (Syfy), Monsters and Mysteries in America (Destination America), True Supernatural (Destination America), Ultimate Encounters (truTV), Monster Project (Nat Geo Wild) and Shipping Wars (A&E).

His credits include appearances on several news broadcasts, Coast to Coast AM, and Ireland’s Newstalk, as well as being featured in various books, DVDs and in articles by the Associated Press, Houston Chronicle and Tampa Tribune. Gerhard has contributed to trade publications including Fate Magazine, Animals and Men, Cryptid Culture, The Journal of the British Columbia Scientific Cryptozoology Club and Bigfoot Times.

He currently lectures and exhibits at events across the United States.

References
Profile from Coast to Coast AM

Cryptozoologists
Living people
1967 births